Wolffsohn's leaf-eared mouse (Phyllotis wolffsohni) is a species of rodent in the family Cricetidae. It is found only in Bolivia.

References

Phyllotis
Mammals of Bolivia
Mammals described in 1902
Taxa named by Oldfield Thomas
Taxonomy articles created by Polbot